Jack Stevens (1903–1961) was an American cinematographer active during the silent and early sound era. He worked on several Laurel and Hardy films for Hal Roach Studios. He was the elder brother of the director George Stevens.

Selected filmography

 Mine to Keep (1923)
 Other Men's Daughters (1923)
 American Manners (1924)
 The Law Forbids (1924)
 Stepping Lively (1924)
 The Fighting Demon (1925)
 The Isle of Hope (1925)
 The Broadway Gallant (1926)
 The Night Patrol (1926)
 The Merry Cavalier (1926)
 The Better Man (1926)
 The Blue Streak (1926)
 The Cavalier (1928)
 Another Fine Mess (1930)
 Beau Hunks (1931)
 Pardon Us (1931)
 Our Wife (1931)
 Chickens Come Home (1931)
 Speed Madness (1932)
 Get That Girl (1932)
 On Your Guard (1933)
 The Cuckoo Clock (1938)

References

Bibliography
 Bliss, Michael. Laurel and Hardy's Comic Catastrophes: Laughter and Darkness in the Features and Short Films. Rowman & Littlefield, 2017.
 Slide, Anthony. She Could Be Chaplin!: The Comedic Brilliance of Alice Howell. University Press of Mississippi, 2016.

External links

1903 births
1961 deaths
American cinematographers
People from Oakland, California